Ahmad Shaharuddin Rosdi  (born 22 May 1975) is a former Malaysian footballer who was a midfielder for Pahang and the Malaysia national football team.

Career
Ahmad Shaharuddin started his football career with Pahang in 1995. After he had bad knee injury on 2004, he were inactive from football for a year, before he decided to join PKNS FC for 2005/2006 season.

He also was the member of Malaysia football team from 1998 until 2003.

Coaching career
After retired from playing football, Ahmad Shaharuddin Rosdi turned into coaching, and appointed the assistant coach of Pahang in 2010. And on 15 Dec 2015, he was appointed as Pahang FA head coach replacing former head coach, Zainal Abidin Hassan. After several inconsistent performances in the league and cup competition, Shaharuddin was reverted to his original assistant head coach position in March 2016, days after Pahang announced Razip Ismail to be their new head coach for the rest of the season.

Achievements

International
 Second Runners-up Tiger Cup 2000

Club
With Pahang FA
 Runners-up  1995, 1997 Malaysia Cup
 Champion 1995 M-League

Personal

References

External links
 PAHANG AND PERLIS SHARE POINTS IN M'SIA CUP.
 Kenangan di Toulon
 Shaharuddin sedia menyahut cabaran
 Shaharuddin dalam perhatian Yunus
 Tok Gajah tanpa kelibat Azizul - 9 pemain lain setuju wakili semula Pahang bagi Liga Malaysia musim depan
 Kita tempat ketiga
 Pahang pesta gol

Malaysian footballers
1975 births
Living people
People from Pahang
Sri Pahang FC managers
Association football midfielders
Malaysian football managers